Rain activated art is a kind of street art, called "rainworks" by the creator, Seattle artist Peregrine Church. It utilizes a superhydrophobic coating on a sidewalk which is invisible when dry, but when it rains, reveal a pattern created by the artist. As of March 2015, there are approximately 25 installations in Seattle, supported by a grant from Awesome Foundation, and several more commissioned pieces at and around the Hands On Children's Museum in Olympia, Washington. Church started creating the works in Seattle in May, 2014.

References

External links
 rain.works

Art in Washington (state)
Visual arts media
2014 in art
Public art in Seattle